WYML-LP is a low power community radio station, headquartered in Ingleside, Illinois and transmitting from Prairie Grove, Illinois. The station supports the eastern McHenry County and western Lake County areas, providing a mix of commercial and local music as well as community support for the businesses in the area.

WYML-LP started as a youth educational project in 2005, growing to a streaming and then an FM station, providing opportunities for education by relationships with the local schools (grade schools, high schools, trade schools and colleges).

References

External links
 WWW.WYML.US
 

YML-LP
2016 establishments in Illinois
Radio stations established in 2016
YML-LP